"867-5309/Jenny" is a 1981 song written by Alex Call and Jim Keller and performed by Tommy Tutone that was released on the album Tommy Tutone 2, on the Columbia Records label. It peaked at No. 4 on the Billboard Hot 100 chart in May 1982, and No. 1 on the Billboard Hot Mainstream Rock Tracks chart in April 1982.

The song led to a fad of people dialing 867-5309 and asking for "Jenny".

Creation
Lead guitarist Jim Keller, interviewed by People in 1982, said: "Jenny is a regular girl, not a hooker. Friends of mine wrote her name and number on a men's room wall at a bar. I called her on a dare, and we dated for a while. I haven't talked with her since the song became a hit, but I hear she thinks I'm a real jerk for writing it."

On March 28, 2008, Tommy Tutone lead singer Tommy Heath stated on the WGN Morning News that the number was real and it was the number of a girl he knew. As a joke, he wrote it on a bathroom wall in a motel where they were staying. "We laughed about it for years," he said.

However, in a June 2004 interview with Songfacts, co-writer Alex Call explained his version of the song's real origins:

"There was no Jenny," Call also told a Tampa, Florida, columnist in June 2009. "The number? It came to me out of the ether."

In the music video, the "Jenny" character is played by Karen Elaine Morton.

Popularity and litigation
The song, released in late 1981, initially gained popularity on the American West Coast in January 1982; many who had the number soon abandoned it because of unwanted calls.

Asking telephone companies to trace the calls was of no use, as Charles and Maurine Shambarger (then in West Akron, Ohio at +1-216-867-5309) learned when Ohio Bell explained: "We don’t know what to make of this. The calls are coming from all over the place." A little over a month later, they disconnected the number and the phone became silent.

In some cases, the number was picked up by commercial businesses or acquired for use in radio promotions.
 In 1982, WLS radio obtained the number from a Chicago woman, receiving 22,000 calls in four days.
 In 1982, Southwest Junior High School received up to two hundred calls daily asking for Jenny in area code 704.
 Brown University obtained the +1-401-867 prefix in 1999, assigning 867-5309 to a student dormitory room which was promptly inundated with nuisance calls.
 A February 2004 auction for the number in a New York City code was shut down by eBay after objections from Verizon; bidding had reached $80,000. The US Federal Communications Commission takes the position that most phone numbers are "public resources" that "are not owned by carriers or their customers" but did not rule out the number being sold as part of a business.
 A subsequent February 2004 auction for the number in area code 800 and 888 listed Jeffrey Steinberg's Philadelphia business JSS Marketing for sale, including both numbers as part of the bundle. This circumvents eBay restrictions which prevent selling the numbers on their own.
 In 2004, Weehawken, New Jersey resident Spencer Potter picked up the number for free after discovering to his surprise that it was available in the 201 area code, hoping it would improve his DJ business. Unable to handle the overwhelming volume of calls, he sought to sell the number on eBay in February 2009. Although bids reached $1 million, his inability to confirm the identity of the bidders led him to sell it privately to Retro Fitness, a gym franchise with a location in Secaucus, New Jersey that felt the 1980s origin of the number tied in with their business' retro theme.
 In 2006, Benjamin Franklin Franchising, a large national plumbing franchise, began using a toll-free version of the number (+1-866-867-5309), which it advertises as "867-5309/Benny". In 2007, Gem Plumbing & Heating brought suit against Clockwork Home Services, the parent company of Benjamin Franklin Franchising, alleging a violation of its trademark. Clockwork contended that Gem's trademark was invalid. Effective in May 2007, Clockwork was ordered by a court to stop using the number in New England. According to Tommy Heath, lead singer of Tommy Tutone: "It's ridiculous. If I wanted to get into it, I could probably take the number away from both of them."
 In 2009, nutrition firm Natrient LLC leased +1-800-867-5309 from 5309 Partners Ltd for $25 million as part of a radio ad campaign.
 In July 2009, Jason Kaplan had +1-267-867-5309 assigned to a Vonage phone line in the name of a small business and then listed the entire business for sale on eBay. The auction closed at $5,500.
 In January 2013, Five309 LLC announced plans to use 855-867-5309 and 888-867-5309 to promote the website JennySearch.com.
 In 2013, Florida realtor Carrie Routt was still receiving fifty prank calls daily at +1-850-867-5309.
 A Fort Collins, Colorado restaurant, Totally 80's Pizza, uses +1-970-867-5309 as part of its 1980s theme.

Springsteen controversy
Singer-songwriter Bruce Springsteen's 2007 single "Radio Nowhere" features a set of guitar riffs at the beginning that many fans considered particularly similar to "867-5309/Jenny", although the lyrics and the tone of the two songs are quite different. Regarding legal action, Heath said "I think it's close enough that if I wanted to, I could work with it... I don't really get into that sort of thing, but the kids do need braces, so maybe I will." He later clarified that he had no interest in suing and felt "really honored at a similarity, if any."

Charts

Weekly charts

Year-end charts

See also 
 Fictitious telephone number
 
 List of Billboard Mainstream Rock number-one songs of the 1980s

References

External links
 
 867-5309 in all US and Canadian Area Codes (Telephone World)

1981 singles
1981 songs
1982 singles
Columbia Records singles
Songs about telephone calls
Songs used as jingles
Songs written by Alex Call
Telephone numbers in the United States
Tommy Tutone songs